Eaglets (Swedish: Örnungar) is a 1944 Swedish drama film directed by Ivar Johansson and starring Alice Babs, Lasse Dahlquist and Sten Lindgren. It was shot at the Centrumateljéerna Studios in Stockholm. The film's sets were designed by the art director Bertil Duroj.

Cast
 Alice Babs as 	Marianne Hedvall
 Lasse Dahlquist as 	Erik Stenström
 Sten Lindgren as 	Tor Hedvall
 Stina Ståhle as Ester Lindeborg
 Curt Masreliez as Gunnar Gyllencrona
 Margareta Fahlén as Maj-Britt 
 Kaj Hjelm as 	Olle Svensson 
 Margaretha Bergström as 	Gullan Bring 
 Rune Halvarsson as 	Fingal Svensson
 Harriett Philipson as 	Cecilia Käck
 Åke Hylén as 	Olle Fryklöf
 Julia Cæsar as 	Hulda
 Carl Hagman as 	Major 
 Gunnel Wadner as 	Flower Girl

References

Bibliography 
 Qvist, Per Olov & von Bagh, Peter. Guide to the Cinema of Sweden and Finland. Greenwood Publishing Group, 2000.

External links 
 

1944 films
Swedish drama films
1944 drama films
1940s Swedish-language films
Films directed by Ivar Johansson
Swedish black-and-white films
1940s Swedish films